David Howard Johnson (born August 21, 1963) is an American politician in the state of Minnesota. He served in the Minnesota State Senate.

References

1963 births
Living people
Minnesota state senators